GoldED was a popular message editor for FidoNet-compatible computer networks.

In 1998, Odinn Sørensen released the source code of GoldED and Goldware Utilities 3.x under GNU General Public License version 2, and the Goldware Library under GNU Library General Public License version 2. A permission has also been given to link that all with software conforming with the Open Source Definition.

The code of one of the libraries used by GoldED and GoldED+, CXL, has been licensed by Sørensen from its author, Mike Smedley. Since then the copyright has been taken over by “Innovative Data Concepts”, which, as Sørensen suspected in 1998, has disappeared. This was one of the reasons for removing the goldedplus package from Debian repositories in 2006.

By 1999, all the developers of GoldED left FidoNet.

GoldED+ 

The development still continued in a stylecode-related fork maintained by Alexander S. Aganichev (ASA) called “GoldED-asa”. When the file names of “GoldED-asa” didn’t fit in the MS-DOS length limit anymore, the fork has been renamed to “GoldED+”.

By 2007 GoldED+ was the most popular cross-platform message editor in Russian-speaking FidoNet.

Actually, the development has been moved to GoldED+ at GitHub

See also

References 

FidoNet software
C++ software
Cross-platform software